Joanópolis is a municipality in the state of São Paulo in Brazil. The population is 13,338 (2020 est.) in an area of 374 km². The elevation is 906 m.

References

Municipalities in São Paulo (state)